Ekaterina Valeryevna Velmezova (Ekaterina Valer'yevna Vel'mezova; ; 3 February 1973) is a Russian and Swiss philologist, professor of Slavistics and of history and epistemology of language sciences in Eastern Europe at the University of Lausanne, whose principal works concern Russian and Czech ethnolinguistics, as well as history and epistemology of language sciences in Central and Eastern Europe.

Ekaterina Velmezova published the first ever corpus of Czech incantations (Вельмезова, 2004). Her monograph about Nicholas Marr (the largest book about Marr's linguistic doctrines) describes Marr's theories in the context of the language sciences of his era.

Ekaterina Velmezova is the author of a new conception supposing analysis of linguistic theories through literary texts (Вельмезова 2014).

Ekaterina Velmezova is a member of the board of directors of the Society of History and Epistemology of Language Sciences (Paris), official representative of Swiss Slavists at the International Committee of Slavists, a member of the board of directors of Cercle Ferdinand de Saussure (Geneva) and vice-president of the Centre for Linguistics and Language Sciences at the University of Lausanne.

Biography 
In 2000, Ekaterina Velmezova defended her first PhD thesis, dedicated to the Czech language and folklore, at the Institute of Slavic Studies of the Russian Academy of Sciences. Her second thesis, dedicated to the history of semantic ideas, was defended at the University of Lausanne in 2005 and earned an award from the Faculty of Arts. In 2007, she received the Habilitation à Diriger des Recherches degree from the University of Toulouse II – Le Mirail.

Since 2015 Ekaterina Velmezova is full professor of Slavistics and of history and epistemology of language sciences in Eastern Europe at the University of Lausanne.

Monographs

Collections

References

See also 
 
 

Russian philologists
Women philologists
Women linguists
Swiss philologists
Slavists
1973 births
Living people